Pavel Harazim (born 30 June 1969) is a retired Czech football defender. He made over 250 top-flight appearances spanning the existence of the Czechoslovak First League and the Gambrinus liga. He was one of a large number of players to leave SFC Opava in May 2004.

References

1969 births
Living people
Czech footballers
Czechoslovak footballers
Czech First League players
MFK Vítkovice players
FK Hvězda Cheb players
FK Drnovice players
FC Baník Ostrava players
SFC Opava players

Association football defenders